Dato' Mohamad Nasir bin Mohamed (born 4 July 1957) is a Malaysian poet, singer-songwriter, composer, producer, actor and film director also known as a Sifu in the Malaysian music industry.

Early life
M. Nasir was born on July 4, 1957 in Bukit Panjang, Singapore. He is the fourth of nine siblings. His father, Mohamed Sam, hailed from Pagoh, Muar in Johor and emigrated to Singapore. He worked as a firefighter in the Singapore Fire Department while his mother, Esah Yahya is a housewife who have a keen interest in the life story of Prophet Muhammad and studies in Arabic. After Singapore was expelled from Malaysia in 1965, his family decided to obtain the Singaporean citizenship. Nasir began his early education at the Sekolah Tinggi Kerajaan Bukit Panjang before pursuing his studies at the Boys Town Vocational Institute. He attended the Nanyang Academy of Fine Arts and graduated with a diploma in Western painting in 1978, originally wanting to become an artist.

Career

M. Nasir had been deeply exposed to music not only through listening to the radio but also through his elder brother who had brought him purchased records of bands such as Bob Dylan, Queen, Al Stewart and Led Zeppelin while they were growing up in Singapore in the 1960s and 1970s.

He was roped into music making in 1978 when a friend of his Wan Ibrahim, then executive producer of PolyGram Singapore, invited him to write song lyrics for the band Alleycats, who were rising in popularity at that time.

Nasir decided to venture into singing, releasing his debut album Untuk Pencinta Seni under the name of Mohamad MN in 1979, which ended up being a flop. He moved on to form the folk rock act Kembara in 1981 with A. Ali, S. Sahlan and siblings Abby and Eddie Ali. The Ali siblings however left the group in its infancy due to disagreements on picking the band's genre.

Kembara released their own self-titled debut album, which became a commercial success with 25,000 copies sold. The band went on to release six albums and before disbanding in late 1985.

After Kembara disbanded, Nasir went solo again. In 1989, he released his second solo album, S.O.L.O under PMC/BMG. This was his first solo album in 10 years since Untuk Pencinta Seni (1979) and the first to be registered under his present name. He went on record five more solo albums – namely Saudagar Mimpi (1992), Canggung Mendonan (1993), Srikandi Cintaku (1999), Phoenix Bangkit (2001) and Sang Pencinta (2006), all of which became commercial successes. Though Nasir announced that he will release an 8th studio album, it did not materialise.

He also dabbles in the art of painting, particularly abstract art. He has conducted several exhibitions on his canvas works; the first being Tanda in 2014 and Tanda II in 2015, both in Shah Alam.

Personal life 
Nasir moved with his family to Malaysia in 1984, where he became a naturalised citizen in 1989.

He married Junainah Johari, who was the lead singer of Ideal Sisters, Singapore's earliest girl group on September 12, 1981. Their relationship – from which they have five children namely Ilham, Yasin, Hidayat, Syafi'i and Nurnilam Sari – lasted until Junainah's death on 8 August 1998 due to asthma. Nasir's second marriage not long after was with actress Marlia Musa, and they both have a daughter named Suci Musalmah.

His children are also involved in music making: Ilham, Yasin and Hidayat make up the band Pitahati while Syafi'i is a member of the psychedelic rock band Ramayan.

His father, Mohamed Sam, died on 28 January 2021 due to natural causes at the age of 96. Nasir was unable to return to Singapore to attend his father's funeral due to COVID-19 restrictions.

Partial discography

With Kembara 
Kembara (1981)
Perjuangan (1982)
Generasi Ku (1983)
Seniman Jalanan (1984)
1404 Hijrah (1984)
Duit (1985)
Lagu-Lagu Dari Filem Kembara Seniman Jalanan (1986)

Solo albums 
Untuk Pencinta Seni (1979)
Irama M. Nasir – instrumental LP (1982)
S.O.L.O (1988)
Saudagar Mimpi (1992)
Canggung Mendonan (1993)
Srikandi Cintaku (1999)
Phoenix Bangkit (2001)
Sang Pencinta (2006)

Duet album(s) 
Dia Ibuku – with Yunizar Hussein (1981)

Compilation albums 
Best Of Kembara (2001)
Best of M. Nasir Dengan Kembara (2001)

Filmography

Film

Television show

Television series

Awards and achievements

Other honours 
 1994:  Awarded the Ahli Mangku Negara (A.M.N.) by the then-Yang di-Pertuan Agong, Salahuddin Abdul Aziz Shah ibni al-Marhum Sultan Hisamuddin Alam Shah.
 2001:  Awarded the Ahli Mahkota Pahang (A.M.P) by the Sultan of Pahang, Ahmad Shah.
 2011:  Awarded the ‘Darjah Indera Mahkota Pahang’ by the Sultan of Pahang, which grants the title of "Dato'".
 2014: conferred the Honorary Degree of Doctor of Philosophy (Creative Industries Management) by Universiti Utara Malaysia

References

External links

M. Nasir & Luncai Emas Official Website
Muzik Nusantara – Hamlau
Musicmoz.org
Prahara Seni
 

1957 births
Living people
Singaporean Muslims
Malaysian Muslims
Malaysian male actors
Malaysian people of Malay descent
Malaysian male singer-songwriters
Malaysian singer-songwriters
Malaysian rhythm and blues singers
Malaysian world music singers
Malay-language singers
Naturalised citizens of Malaysia
Singaporean emigrants to Malaysia
Singaporean people of Malay descent
Members of the Order of the Defender of the Realm
Nanyang Academy of Fine Arts alumni